Major is an English-language given name, which often causes confusion with the military rank of the same name.

People with the name or nickname include:

Sports
 Major Applewhite (born 1978), American football quarterback and coach
 Major Booth (1886–1916), English cricketer
 Major Culbert (born 1987), American football player
 Major Davis (1882–1959), English cricketer
 Major Everett (born 1960), American football player
 Major Kerby Farrell (1913–1975), American baseball player and manager
 Major Goodsell (1900–1988), Australian rower
 Major Harris (American football) (born 1968), American football player
 Major Jones (born 1953), American basketball player
 Major Ritchie (1870–1955), English tennis player
 Major Taylor (1878–1932), American cyclist nicknamed "Major"
 Major Wingate (born 1983), American basketball player
 Major Wright (born 1988), American football player

Politics
 Major Andre Andrews (1792–1834), American politician in New York
 Major Coxson (1929–1973), American politician in New Jersey
 Major M. Hillard (1896–1977), American politician in Virginia
 Major Knight (1812–1891), American politician in Maine
 Major Logue (1826–1900), Australian politician in Western Australia
 Major C. Mead (1858–1925), American politician in Wisconsin
 Major Olímpio (1962–2021), Brazilian politician
 Major Owens (1936–2013), American politician in New York
 Major Thibaut (born 1977), American politician in Louisiana

Media and entertainment
 Major Dodson (born 2003), American actor
 Major Garrett (born 1962), American journalist
 Major Harris (singer) (1947–2012), American R&B singer
 Klaus Heuser (born 1957), German rock guitarist and producer
 Major Holley (1924–1990), American jazz musician
 Major Lance (1939–1994), American R&B singer
 Major (American musician) (born 1984), American pop soul musician and actor Major R. Johnson Finley

Others
 Major Downes (1834–1923), British Army general
 Major Greenwood (1880–1949), English scientist
 Major B. Harding (born 1935), American judge in Florida
 Major Rohde Hawkins (1821–1884), English architect
 Major Nichols (1914–2005), English cycle-maker
 Major "Moogy" Sumner, Aboriginal Australian elder, dancer and cultural adviser
 Major Jackson (born 1968), American poet

See also
 Major (disambiguation), which includes fictional characters